Scolia is a genus of scoliid wasps in the subfamily Scoliinae. There are at least 50 described species in Scolia.

Species
These species belong to the genus Scolia:

 Scolia affinis Guérin-Méneville, 1830
 Scolia anatoliae Osten, 2004
 Scolia asiella Betrem, 1935
 Scolia bicincta Fabricius, 1775 – double-banded scoliid
 Scolia binotata Fabricius 1804
 Scolia bnun Tsuneki, 1972
 Scolia carbonaria (Linnaeus, 1767)
 Scolia clypeata Sickmann 1894
 Scolia consors (Saussure, 1863)
 Scolia cypria Saussure, 1854
 Scolia dubia (Say, 1837) – two-spotted scoliid wasp, blue-winged scoliid wasp
 Scolia ebenina Saussure, 1858
 Scolia erythrocephala Fabricius, 1798
 Scolia erythropyga Burmeister, 1853
 Scolia fallax Eversmann, 1849
 Scolia fasciatopunctata Guerin 1838
 Scolia flaviceps Eversmann, 1846
 Scolia fuciformis Scopoli, 1786
 Scolia galbula (Pallas, 1771)
 Scolia guttata (Burmeister, 1853)
 Scolia hirta (Schrank, 1781)
 Scolia histrionica (Fabricius 1787)
 Scolia hortorum Fabricius, 1787
 Scolia kuroiwae Matsumura & Uchida 1926
 Scolia mexicana (Saussure, 1858)
 Scolia nigrita Fabricius
 Scolia nobilis Saussure 1858
 Scolia nobilitata (Fabricius, 1805) – noble scoliid wasp
 Scolia oculata Matsumura 1911 – yellow-banded scoliid wasp
 Scolia orientalis Saussure, 1856
 Scolia picteti Saussure 1854
 Scolia rufiventris (Fabricius 1804)
 Scolia rugifrons Betrem 1928
 Scolia semitacta Bradley, 1959
 Scolia sexmaculata (O. F. Müller, 1766)
 Scolia sinensis Saussure 1864
 Scolia superciliaris Saussure 1864
 Scolia turkestanica Betrem 1935
 Scolia verticalis (Fabricius, 1775)– yellow-headed flower wasp, yellow-headed scoliid wasp
 Scolia vollenhoveni Saussure 1859
 Scolia wahlbergii Saussure, 1859
 Scolia watanabei Matsumura 1912
 † Scolia distincta Zhang, 1989
 † Scolia saussureana Heer, 1865

References

Hymenoptera genera
Scoliidae